Richard Hays may refer to:

 Richard B. Hays (born 1948), American academic
 Richard Hays (health sciences), Australian academic who at one time was a professor in England

See also
Richard Hayes (disambiguation)
Richard Hay (disambiguation)